The Comptroller General of the Republic of Costa Rica,, is a legal comptroller framework in Costa Rica. 

It is a constitutional body of the state, an assistant of the Legislative Assembly, with supreme control of public finances in Costa Rica.

Past and present
The Comptroller General was established in 1951, based on the 1949 Constitution of Costa Rica.

The headquarters building faces on La Sabana Metropolitan Park, the largest urban park in San José city.

Buildings and structures in San José, Costa Rica
Government of Costa Rica
Institutions of Costa Rica
Organizations based in San José, Costa Rica